Donald W. Burgess (born 1947) is an American meteorologist who has made important contributions to understanding of severe convective storms, particularly tornadoes, radar observations and techniques, as well as to training other meteorologists. He was a radar operator during the first organized storm chasing expeditions by the University of Oklahoma (OU) in the early 1970s and participated in both the VORTEX projects.

Biography

Burgess was born in 1947 in Okmulgee, Oklahoma. Burgess studied atmospheric sciences and meteorology at OU, attaining a B.S. in engineering in 1971 and a M.S. in 1974. He worked at the National Severe Storms Laboratory (NSSL) as a research meteorologist and made major contributions to the NEXRAD Doppler radar program, especially concerning severe storms and tornadoes. Burgess led the team that developed the tornadic vortex signature (TVS) and also pioneered development of the concept of nowcasting as he used radar at NSSL in directing research teams to intercept severe and tornadic storms. Burgess additionally participated in the field for field projects, was a collaborator for VORTEX1 from 1994-1995, and was on the steering committee and was a principal investigator (PI) for VORTEX2 from 2009-2010. Another area of focus has been improving weather forecasting. Burgess also worked at the Radar Training Branch (RTB), the NEXRAD Operational Support Facility (OSF), and the Cooperative Institute for Mesoscale Meteorological Studies (CIMMS) at the University of Oklahoma.

Burgess has appeared on NOVA and National Geographic Explorer as well as the IMAX documentary Tornado Alley. He has been featured in The Atlantic, Weatherwise, the USA Today, and other publications. In retirement he worked with other prominent severe storms researchers on an informal six year resurvey project of the Tri-State Tornado. He has previously done comprehensive resurvey work on the 1947 Glazier–Higgins–Woodward tornadoes. Burgess is also a recreational storm chaser and contributed to Storm Track magazine. He was elected a Fellow of the American Meteorological Society in 1993.

Burgess is married and has two children.

See also
 Leslie R. Lemon

References

External links
 
 Interview with Don Burgess May 1998 NSSL Norman, OK by Roy Britt
 VORTEX2 

American meteorologists
University of Oklahoma alumni
Storm chasers
Living people
1947 births
National Weather Service people
Fellows of the American Meteorological Society